Coniochaetaceae is a fungal family in the order Coniochaetales. The family was updated in 2020.

Genera 

 Barrina  (1)
 Coniochaeta  (81)

References

External links 
 

Coniochaetales
Ascomycota families